Brian Baker was the defending champion, but chose not to compete.
Ryan Harrison won the final 6–2, 6–3 against Facundo Argüello.

Seeds

Draw

Finals

Top half

Bottom half

References
 Main Draw
 Qualifying Draw

2013 ATP Challenger Tour
2013 Singles